The Catalonian independence referendums of 2009–2010 have been carried out by civil society and the implications of public institutions for their organizations are persecuted by the Spanish State. But several city councils and comarcal councils have approved motions in favor of this referendum to be called a civil organization, supporting them in this way without violating the laws.

Municipalities

Comarcal Councils

Comarcal councils for the query

Comarcal councils against the query

References

Catalan independence movement
2009 in Catalonia
2010 in Catalonia
Catalonia
Referendums in Catalonia
2010 referendums
2011 referendums